William Brown Carswell (January 8, 1883 – September 7, 1953) was an American lawyer, member of the New York State Senate, Justice of the New York Supreme Court, and Dean of Brooklyn Law School.

Biography
He was the son of David Bruce Carswell and Ann (Brown) Carswell. The family emigrated to the United States in 1887, and settled in Brooklyn. He attended public schools, graduated from Brooklyn Law School in 1908, was admitted to the bar in 1909, and practiced in Brooklyn. He married Charlotte E. Riegger (c.1898–1962), and they had two sons.

Carswell was a member of the New York State Senate (6th D.) from 1913 to 1916, sitting in the 136th, 137th, 138th and 139th New York State Legislatures.

He was Assistant Corporation Counsel of New York City for Brooklyn from 1917 to 1922. He was a justice of the New York Supreme Court (2nd D.) from 1923 until his death, and sat on the Appellate Division from 1927 on. He was also Dean of Brooklyn Law School from 1945 until his death in 1953.

He died on September 7, 1953, while on vacation in Sherbrooke, Quebec.

Sources

 HYLAN ASKS MOTHER TO VOTE AGAINST SON in New York Times on November 7, 1922
 Bio at New York Court System
 MRS. W. B. CARSWELL OF BROOKLYN LAW, 64 in New York Times on September 21, 1962 (subscription required)

1883 births
1953 deaths
Democratic Party New York (state) state senators
Politicians from Brooklyn
New York Supreme Court Justices
Lawyers from Edinburgh
Scottish emigrants to the United States
Brooklyn Law School alumni
20th-century American judges
Deans of law schools in the United States
Brooklyn Law School faculty
Deans of Brooklyn Law School
20th-century American politicians
Politicians from Edinburgh
20th-century American academics